EISOO Information Technology Corp. is a Chinese cloud computing company, dealing with sync & sharing, data protection (backup, disaster recovery and virtualization management) and managed cloud service, with a goal to provide a solution for business to ensure both system availability and secure content management. EISOO was founded in 2006 and is headquartered in Shanghai, China.

Until 2016, EISOO mainly promoted three product lines: AnyShare, AnyBackup, and EISOO Managed Cloud Service (EMCS).
 In 2017, Eisoo added another service called EISOO AI. This service is a trading platform, based on the work of the artificial intelligence AnyRobot.

History 
 2006.04 EISOO Software Co., Ltd. was founded by Frank He
 2007.04 EISOO cooperated with BitDefender Ltd. Provided a full backup utility for BitDefender Total Security 20081
 2008.01 EISOO released AnyBackup appliance in China 2.1 2
 2008.07 EISOO's backup software  SuperBackup, was chosen by Microsoft(China), to be included in Microsoft "Happy Package"[3]
 2008.08 EISOO provided disaster recovery solution for IBM servers: IBM System x3610, IBM System x3100 [4]
 2009.07 EISOO works with Dell to build Dell PowerBackup Solution
 2009.11 Dell, Inc. signed an agreement with EISOO Technology to start their strategic partnership. The partners launched their joint data backup products to provide data protection service for small and medium business [5]
 2011 EISOO published a secure document management appliance 
 2014 EISOO released the first private file cloud in China – AnyShare 3.5 [6]
 2015 EISOO promoted the Intelligent Data Management Solutions under the CAM trend
 2015 EISOO changed its name from EISOO Software Co. Ltd to EISOO Information Technology Corp. and started to transform its business to cloud computing.[7]
 2017 EISOO released AnyRobot Log Management and Analytics for Enterprise
 2017 EISOO released international trading service EISOO AI powered by AnyRobot 8
 2018 EISOO released EISOO AI with AnyRobot 2.0 and started an international promotion with a budget of $1 000 0009

References

https://www.pcmag.com/article2/0,2817,2174280,00.asp
http://storage.chinabyte.com/445/12697445.shtml
http://www.microsoft.com/China/smb/local/c2b/Offer/Fudai/Product/BackUp/
https://web.archive.org/web/20110707014411/http://server.ccw.com.cn/yjzx/htm2008/20081112_542229.shtml
http://chinese.direct2dell.com/archive/2009/11/05/13148.aspx
http://digi.163.com/14/0324/17/9O4AS0BE001665EV.html
http://www.ccidnet.com/2015/1009/10034438.shtml

Companies based in Shanghai
Software companies of China
Chinese brands